Yuri Vadimovich Korablin (30 January 1960 – 20 September 2016) was a Russian businessman, investor, and politician, born in Moscow. Former mayor of Khimki, Korablin became owner of Italian football club Unione Venezia in February 2011.

References

External links
 Биография
Parla il russo Yuri Korablin, lo zar.  Tutto è cominciato per un’acqua alta...

1960 births
2016 deaths
Businesspeople from Moscow
Mayors of places in Russia
Russian football chairmen and investors
Venezia F.C.
Khimki